This is a list of artillery of the Second World War ordered by name. Naval artillery is not included.

A-I
 Army 20 cm Rocket:  Japanese 200 mm artillery rocket
 BL 4.5 inch:  British 114 mm gun
 BL 5.5 inch:  British 140 mm gun
 BL 7.2 inch:  British 183 mm howitzer
 BL 60 Pounder:  British 127 mm gun
 Bofors 37 mm:  Swedish 37 mm light antitank gun
 Bofors 40 mm gun:  Swedish 40 mm antiaircraft gun
 Bofors Model 29:  Swedish 75 mm antiaircraft gun
 Bofors Model 34:  Swedish 75 mm mountain gun
 Brandt mle 27/31:  French 81 mm mortar
 Brixia Model 35:  45 mm light mortar of Italy
 Canon Court de 105 M mle 1919 Schneider:  French 105 mm mountain gun
 Canon Court de 105 M mle 1928 Schneider:  French 105 mm mountain gun
 Canon de 25 mm SA mle 1934:  French 25 mm light antitank gun
 Canon de 75 M mle 1919 Schneider:  French 75 mm mountain gun
 Canon de 75 M mle 1928:  French 75 mm mountain gun
 Canon de 105 court mle 1913: French 105 mm gun
 Canon de 105 court mle 1935 B: French 105 mm howitzer
 Canon de 105 court mle 1934 Schneider: French 105 mm gun
 Canon de 105 L mle 1936 Schneider: French 105 mm gun
 Canon de 155 mle 1917 CS: French 155 mm howitzer
 Canon de 155 GPF: French 155 mm gun
 Canon de 75 modele 1934:  Belgian 75 mm mountain gun
 Canon d'Infanterie de 37 modèle 1916 TRP: French 37 mm infantry gun (fast-firing)
 FlaK 18:  German 88 mm antiaircraft gun
 FlaK 30:  German 20 mm antiaircraft gun
 FlaK 36:  German 37 mm antiaircraft gun
 FlaK 37:  German 37 mm antiaircraft gun
 FlaK 38 2 cm:  German 20 mm antiaircraft gun
 FlaK 38 10.5 cm:  German 105 mm antiaircraft gun
 FlaK 40 12.8 cm:  German 128 mm antiaircraft gun
 FlaK 41 5 cm:  German 50 mm antiaircraft gun
 FlaK 41 8.8 cm:  German 88 mm antiaircraft/antitank gun
 FlaK 43:  German 37 mm antiaircraft gun
 FlaK vierling 38:  German quad 20 mm antiaircraft gun
 GebFlak 38:  German 20 mm mountain antiaircraft gun
 Gustav:  German 800 mm siege gun
 7.5 cm IG 37: German 75 mm infantry gun
 Infantry Howitzer:  British 94 mm howitzer

K-N
 Katyusha:  Soviet rocket artillery
 Knee mortar:  Japanese Type 89 50 mm light mortar, called "knee mortar" by American troops who thought it looked designed to be fired braced on the knee (which it was not).
 K 44:  German 128 mm gun
 KwK 36:  German 88 mm tank gun
 KwK 38(t):  German designation of Skoda A7, used on the Panzer 38(t)
 KwK 42: German 75 mm tank gun
 KwK 43 L71:  German long-barrel 88 mm tank gun
 Lance Grenades de 50 mm modèle 37
 Land Mattress:  British 32 tube 76.2 mm rocket artillery
 leFH 18:  German 105 mm howitzer
 leGebIG 18:  German 75 mm mountain infantry gun
 leIG 18:  German 75 mm infantry gun
 Little David:  Aerial bomb firing siege mortar planned for combat service with the United States
 M1 8 inch Howitzer:  American 203 mm howitzer
 4.5 inch Gun M1: American 4.5 Inch Gun
 M2 60 mm Mortar:  60 mm light mortar of the US Army
 M1 75 mm Pack Howitzer:  American 75 mm mountain gun
 M1 90 mm Gun:  American 90 mm antiaircraft gun
 M2 90 mm Gun:  American 90 mm antiaircraft gun/Anti tank gun
 M1 [M114] 155 mm Howitzer:  American 155 mm howitzer
 M1 240 mm Howitzer:  American 240 mm howitzer
 M2 105 mm Howitzer:  American 105 mm howitzer
 M2 155 mm Gun:  American 155 mm gun ("Long Tom")
 M2 4.2 inch Mortar: American 107mm mortar
 M4 4.2 inch recoilless mortar:  American 4.2 inch recoilless mortar
 M3 3 inch Gun:  American 76.2 mm antiaircraft gun
 M3 37 mm Gun:  American 37 mm antitank gun
 M1 57 mm Gun:  American 57 mm antitank gun
 M3 90 mm Gun:  American 90 mm antiaircraft/antitank gun
 M5 3 inch Gun:  American 76.2 mm antitank gun
 M7 3 inch Gun:  American 76.2 mm antitank gun used in the M10 tank destroyer
 M8 4.5 inch Rocket:  American artillery rocket
 M1 75 mm Pack Howitzer:  American 75 mm mountain gun
 M18 recoilless rifle:  Late-war American 57 mm recoilless rifle
 M20 recoilless rifle:  Late-war American 75 mm recoilless rifle
 M1919 16 inch Coast Gun:  American 16 inch coastal defense gun
 M1937 Howitzer:  Soviet 152 mm howitzer
 M1938 Howitzer:  Soviet 122 mm howitzer
 76 mm divisional gun M1939 (USV):  Soviet 76.2 mm gun
 M1942 Gun:  Soviet 76.2 mm field gun and antitank gun
 M1943 Howitzer:  Soviet 152 mm howitzer
 Morser Karl:  600mm German siege howitzer
 Mortaio da 81/14 Modello 35: standard Italian medium infantry mortar
 Mk 7 16"/50 Gun:  American 16" battleship gun
 ML 3 Inch Mortar:  British 76.2 mm mortar
 Mortar Type 89:  Japanese 50 mm light mortar, known by Americans as the Knee mortar
 Nebelwerfer 41:  German six tube 150 mm rocket launcher

O-V
 Obice da 75/18 modello 34:  Italian 75 mm mountain gun
 Obice da 210/22:  Italian 210 mm howitzer
 PaK 35:  German 37 mm light antitank gun
 PaK 36:  German 37 mm light antitank gun
 PaK 38:  German 50 mm antitank gun
 PaK 40:  German 75 mm antitank gun
 PaK 41:  German 75 mm antitank gun
 PaK 43:  German 88 mm heavy antitank gun
 PaK 44:  German 128 mm heavy antitank gun
 Panzerschreck:  German antitank rocket launcher
 PIAT:  British spring-launched antitank grenade launcher
 Polsten:  Polish/British 20 mm anti-aircraft gun
 PzB 41:  German 28 mm light antitank gun
 QF 2 Pounder:  British 40 mm light tank gun and towed antitank gun
 QF 3 inch 20 cwt:  British 76.2 mm antiaircraft gun
 QF 3.7 inch AA:  British 94 mm antiaircraft gun
 QF 6 pounder:  British 57 mm medium tank gun and towed antitank gun
 QF 17 pounder:  British 76.2 mm tank gun and towed antitank gun
 QF 25 pounder:  British 87.6 mm howitzer
QF 3.7-inch mountain howitzer: British 94mm mountain gun
 QF 25 Pounder Short Mk 1:  Australian derivation of the British 25 Pounder
 RCL 3.7 inch Gun:  British 94 mm recoilless rifle
 sFH 18:  German 150 mm howitzer
 sGrW 34:  81 mm medium mortar used by Germany during the war
 sIG 33:  German 150 mm infantry gun
 Skoda A7:  37.2 mm L/47.8 tank gun used on the Panzer 38(t)/TNH P-S light tank
 Skoda K1:  Czech 149 mm howitzer delivered to Turkey, Romania, and Yugoslavia
 Skoda K2:  Czech 150 mm howitzer
 Skoda 47 mm Model 1936:  Czech 47 mm antitank gun
 Skoda M1937:  Czech 37 mm light antitank gun
 Type 01 Gun:  Japanese 37 mm antitank gun
 Type 4 20 cm Rocket Launcher
 Type 11 Gun:  Japanese 37 mm infantry gun
 Type 35 Gun:  Japanese 75 mm infantry gun
 Type 88 Gun:  Japanese 75 mm antiaircraft gun
 Type 89 Leg Mortar:  Japanese 50 mm light mortar, known by Americans as the Knee mortar
 Type 92 Battalion Gun:  Japanese 70 mm infantry and mountain gun
 Type 96 15 cm howitzer:  Japanese 149 mm heavy artillery
 vz. 36 4.7 cm:  Czech 47 mm antitank gun
 vz. 33 14.9 cm:  Czech 149 mm howitzer delivered to Turkey, Romania, and Yugoslavia
 vz. 37 15 cm:  Czech 150 mm howitzer
 wz. 1917 155 mm Polish howitzer
 wz. 02/26 75 mm Polish infantry gun 
 wz. 1914/19P 100 mm Polish howitzer
 wz. 1929 105 mm Polish long range gun
 wz. 36 37 mm Polish anti-tank gun improved, manufactured in Poland under Swedish Bofors licence; some delivered to Spain
 wz. 31 81 mm Polish mortar developed from the French Stockes

See also 

 List of weapons
 List of artillery
 List of World War II weapons

Lists of artillery
Artillery